Chang Island may refer to:

 Koh or Ko Chang ( "Elephant Island"), an island in Thailand
 Changsha (t , s , p Chángshā, "Long Island"), a former island in the Yangtze estuary now forming part of Chongming Island in Shanghai

See also
 Changsha, the capital of China's Hunan province, with an identical Chinese name instead referring to its former long sandy beach